List of South African assassinations refers to a list of alleged and confirmed assassinations, reported to have been conducted by the Apartheid regime.

List

References 

Assassinated South African people

South Africa
Apartheid assassinations